Mongolia had a total primary energy supply (TPES) of 6.66 Mtoe in 2019. Electricity consumption was 7.71 TWh. Mongolia is a big producer of coal, which is mostly exported. Domestic consumption of coal accounts for about 70% of Mongolia's primary energy and makes up most of the electricity generation, accounting for about 87% of the domestic electricity production in 2019.

Electricity generation 

In 2010, the total amount of electricity produced by all types of power plant in Mongolia are 4,256.1 GWh (thermal power), 31 GWh (hydroelectric), 13.2 GWh (diesel) and 0.6 GWh (solar and wind). In 2012, coal was used to generate 98% of the electricity in Mongolia.

Thermal power 
Thermal power station is the dominant type of energy production in Mongolia. There are 7 currently active power stations.

Renewable energy 
In 2018, 7% of Mongolia's electricity came from renewable power sources, mainly wind power. Mongolia has very sunny weather with average insolation above 1,500 kW/m2 in most of the country, making solar power highly available. 247 MW of solar power plants have been approved for construction. Guaranteed power purchase agreements and favorable tariff structures promote further growth of the industry.

Electricity consumption 
In 2018, much of Mongolia's electricity consumption was driven by industry and construction.

See also 

Mongolia Energy Corporation
List of mines in Mongolia#Coal
Environmental issues in Mongolia
Economy of Mongolia

References